Since 1882, 46 players have held the position of club captain for Newton Heath LYR F.C., Newton Heath F.C. or Manchester United F.C.

The first club captain was E. Thomas, who was captain from 1882 to 1883. The longest-serving captain is Bryan Robson, who was club captain from 1982 to 1994, although he held the position jointly with Steve Bruce for the last two years of his tenure. Roy Keane, who was captain from 1997 to 2005, has the distinction of having won the most trophies as captain; he won four Premier League titles, two FA Cups, one Community Shield, one UEFA Champions League and one Intercontinental Cup. The current club captain is Harry Maguire, who took over after Ashley Young departed in 2020.

Captains

Vice-captains
The vice-captain position is not an official position announced by the club, however the position has been announced by mangers after being appointed on a de facto basis. In general, the vice-captain has succeeded the captain.

Notes

References

captains
Manchester United